The Pious Bird of Good Omen is a compilation album by the British blues rock band Fleetwood Mac, released in 1969. It consists of their first four non-album UK singles and their B-sides, two other tracks from their previous album
Mr. Wonderful, and two tracks by the blues artist Eddie Boyd with backing by members of Fleetwood Mac. These two tracks came from Boyd's album 7936 South Rhodes.

The title of the album is a phrase found in an 1817 gloss (marginal note) to Samuel Taylor Coleridge's 1798 epic poem The Rime of the Ancient Mariner. The phrase refers to the albatross killed in the poem ("The ancient Mariner inhospitably killeth the pious bird of good omen"). Its use as an album title as well as the album art is a sly wink to the featuring of the band's number 1 UK hit "Albatross".

The US-only compilation English Rose was a similar package, sharing four songs with this album, and was released earlier in 1969.

In 2002, the tracks from this album were repackaged by Sony BMG and released as a new collection with cover art very closely resembling the Greatest Hits album (1971), but with the addition of "Shake Your Moneymaker" and "Love That Burns".

Reception
Reaction to the album has been highly positive. It was described as "excellent" by the Rolling Stone Album Guide. TeamRock ranked the album in the "20 Greatest Blues Albums: 1967-70".

Track listing

2004 release

* Bonus track

Credits
Fleetwood Mac
Peter Green – vocals, guitar, harmonica
Jeremy Spencer – vocals, slide guitar
Danny Kirwan – vocals, electric guitar (on side 2, tracks 1 and 4)
John McVie – bass guitar
Mick Fleetwood – drums

Additional musicians
Eddie Boyd – vocals, piano (on side 1, track 4 and side 2, track 3)

Technical staff
Mike Vernon – producer
Mike Ross – engineer

2004 release
Fleetwood Mac
Peter Green – vocals (except on tracks 3, 4, 5, and 7), guitar (except on tracks 3 and 4), harmonica (on tracks 2 and 3)
Jeremy Spencer – vocals (on tracks 3 and 4), guitar (on tracks 3 and 4), piano (on track 4)
Danny Kirwan – vocals (on track 8), guitar (on track 5, 7, and 8)
John McVie – bass guitar (except on track 2, 3, and 8)
Mick Fleetwood – drums (except on track 8)
Bob Brunning – bass guitar (on track 3)

Additional musicians
Mickey "Guitar" Baker – string arrangement (on track 1)
Steve Gregory – tenor saxophone (on track 10 and 11)
Christine Perfect – piano (on tracks 9, 10, and 11)
Terry Noonan – director of unidentified strings and horns (on track 1)

Technical staff
Mike Vernon – producer
Mike Ross – engineer

Charts

References

Albums produced by Mike Vernon (record producer)
Fleetwood Mac compilation albums
1969 compilation albums
Blue Horizon Records compilation albums